Lupinus bicolor is a species of lupine known as the miniature lupine, Lindley's annual lupine, pigmy-leaved lupine, or bicolor lupine.

It is a showy flowering annual or perennial plant native to western North America, from northwestern Baja California, throughout California, and north to British Columbia. It is found in diverse habitats below , including: grasslands; chaparral; oak, mixed conifer and Joshua tree woodlands; coastal sage scrub; and open conifer forests. It often shares habitats with other prolifically blooming spring and early summer wildflowers, including the California poppy.

Description
Lupinus bicolor  has a short, hairy stem and thin, palmately-arranged leaves.

As its name suggests the flowers are usually two colors, with one often a deep blue. The other color is often white and sometimes a light purple or magenta. There are sometimes small speckles or spots on the petals.

The plant's hairy pods are quite small, only a couple of centimeters long and very thin, and they contain tiny brownish peas.

Varieties
This plant can be variable in appearance, and there are several varieties/subspecies whose relationships are as yet unclear. Varieties include:
Lupinus bicolor var. rostratus — endemic to California.
Lupinus bicolor var. tridentatus — endemic to California.
Lupinus bicolor var. trifidus — endemic to California.
Lupinus bicolor var. umbellatus — endemic to California.

Cultivation
Lupinus bicolor is cultivated as an ornamental plant, from seed sown in native plant, drought tolerant, and wildlife gardens, and in natural landscaping and habitat restoration projects.

The plants are of value to pollinators, including native bees and bumble bees. At a local spatial scale, Lupinus bicolor was found to increase the abundance of the native Yellow-faced bumble bee (Bombus vosnesenskii) at restoration sites in Santa Barbara, CA.

References

External links

Calflora Database: Lupinus bicolor (Bicolored lupine, miniature lupine)
USDA Plants Profile for Lupinus bicolor
Jepson Manual eFlora (TJM2) treatment of Lupinus bicolor
Coe State Park photo gallery (Lupinus bicolor)
UC Photos gallery — Lupinus bicolor

bicolor
Flora of British Columbia
Flora of Baja California
Flora of California
Flora of Oregon
Flora of Washington (state)
Flora of the Sierra Nevada (United States)
Natural history of the California chaparral and woodlands
Natural history of the California Coast Ranges
Natural history of the Central Valley (California)
Natural history of the Channel Islands of California
Natural history of the Peninsular Ranges
Natural history of the San Francisco Bay Area
Natural history of the Transverse Ranges
Garden plants of North America
Drought-tolerant plants
Flora without expected TNC conservation status